Dichomeris ebenosella is a moth in the family Gelechiidae. It was described by Viette in 1968. It is found in Madagascar.

References

Moths described in 1968
ebenosella